En La Madrugada se Fue (Eng.: Left in the Morning) is a studio album released in 2000 by the romantic music band Los Temerarios. This album was awarded with a Latin Grammy Award for Best Grupero Performance, and became their first number-one album in the Billboard Top Latin Albums chart. This album also is received a double-platinum certification in Mexico with sales of 500,000 units.

Track listing

Te Hice Mal — 4:40 Adolfo Angel 
Dicen Que la Distancia — 4:17 Adolfo Angel 
Eras Todo Para Mi — 4:49 Adolfo Angel 
Adios Te Extrañaré (Mariachi version) — 4:56 Adolfo Angel 
En la Madrugada Se Fue — 3:47 Adolfo Angel 
Adiós Te Extrañaré (Demo version) — 5:37 Adolfo Angel
He Intentado Tanto, Tanto — 3:48 Gustavo Angel 
Quise Olvidarme de Ti — 3:54 Adolfo Angel 
No Es Tan Fácil Olvidarme — 4:42 Adolfo Angel 
Sufriendo Penas — 4:17 Adolfo Angel 
Me Extrañarás — 4:40 Adolfo Angel 
Adiós Te Extrañaré (Pop version) — 5:12 Adolfo Angel 
Te Hice Mal (Demo version) — 6:50 Adolfo Angel

Chart performance

Sales and certifications

Personnel
This information from Allmusic.
Adolfo Ángel Alba: Bass, arranger, keyboards, vocals, concept, music coordinator
Gustavo Ángel Alba: Guitar
Mayra Angelica Alba: Production coordination
Homero Patron: strings, arranger, concept, metal objects
Carlos Abrego: percussion
Sergio Aranda: Background vocals
Eduardo Arias: Stylist
Harry King: Bass
Bernardino De Santiago: Bass
Fernando de Santiago Bass
Jorge Escobar: Arranger
Bernie Grundman: Mastering
Gabriel Martínez: Mixing
Joel Numa: Engineer, mixing
Luis Vega: Mixing
Karlo Vidal: drums
Santiago Yturria: Photography, vocal director
Guillermo Anaya: Photography

See also
List of number-one Billboard Top Latin Albums of 2000

References

2000 albums
Los Temerarios albums
Fonovisa Records albums
Albums produced by Rudy Pérez
Latin Grammy Award for Best Grupero Album